The forest cover in Russia by federal subject as published by the Unified Interdepartmental Statistical Information System. As of 2021 49.4% of Russia is covered in trees.[2]

See also
List of countries by forest area

References
2. https://rainforests.mongabay.com/deforestation/2000/Russia.htm#:~:text=According%20to%20the%20U.N.,carbon%2Ddense%20form%20of%20forest.

Notes
a.  Not recognized internationally as a part of Russia.

Forests of Russia
Federal subjects of Russia-related lists